Masala is a 2005 Indian Kannada-language crime drama film written and directed by Dayal Padmanabhan. The film was produced by K. C. N. Chandrashekar, S. Doreraj, R. Venkatadri, R. Ravindran, Elengovan, N. Kumar and M. Manjunath Gowda under the banner Rainbow Talkies. It features Sunil Raoh and Radhika in the lead. The supporting cast includes Vishal Hegde, Suja, Nagashekar and Sandhya. The score and soundtrack for the film was by Sadhu Kokila. The film was a box office failure.

Cast 

 Sunil Raoh
 Radhika
 Vishal Hegde
 Suja
 Nagashekar
 Sandhya
 Ashitha 
 Sundar Raj
 Ramesh Bhat
 Sarigama Viji
 Bharath Bhagavathar
 A. S. Murthy
 Mandeep Roy
 Venu
 Ganesh as Raghav
 Pavan Kumar
 Muni
 Yogi
 Sathish
 Bullet Prakash
 Padmavasanthi
 Malathi Sardeshpande
 Sithara

Soundtrack 

The film's background score and the soundtracks were composed by Sadhu Kokila. The music rights were acquired by Ananda Audio. The song "Adalu Badalu" is based on "Nibuna Nibuna" from Tamil film Kuththu (2004).

References 

2000s Kannada-language films
2005 crime drama films
2005 films
Indian crime drama films
Films directed by Dayal Padmanabhan